The Fugitive Kind is a 1960 American drama film starring Marlon Brando, Anna Magnani, and Joanne Woodward, directed by Sidney Lumet. The screenplay by Meade Roberts and Tennessee Williams was based on the latter's 1957 play Orpheus Descending, itself a revision of his 1940 work Battle of Angels, which closed after its Boston tryout. Frank Thompson designed the costumes for the film.

Despite being set in the Deep South, the United Artists release was filmed in Milton, New York. At the 1960 San Sebastián International Film Festival, it won the Silver Seashell for Sidney Lumet and the Zulueta Prize for Best Actress for Joanne Woodward.

The film is available on videotape and DVD. A two-disc DVD edition by The Criterion Collection was released in April 2010. It was upgraded to Blu-Ray in January 2020.

A stage production also took place in 2010 at the Arclight Theatre starring Michael Brando, grandson of Marlon Brando, in the lead role. That particular production used the edited film version of the text as opposed to the original play.

Plot
Valentine "Snakeskin" Xavier is a guitar-playing drifter who earns his nickname from his jacket. He flees New Orleans to a small town in order to avoid imprisonment. On his 30th birthday he decides to change his drifting "party boy" life. He finds work in a small-town mercantile store operated by an embittered older woman known as Lady Torrance, whose vicious husband Jabe lies ill in their apartment above the store. An undercurrent of violence, past and present, dominates the town. Both the frequently drunk libertine Carol Cutrere and simple housewife Vee Talbott set their sights on the newcomer, but Snakeskin is attracted to Lady, who has grand plans to open a beautifully decorated "ladies confectionery" wing to the run down store. Sheriff Talbott, a friend of Jabe as well as Vee's husband, threatens to kill Snakeskin if he remains in town, but he chooses to stay when he discovers Lady is pregnant. It sparks Jabe's final acts of resentment, leading to tragic consequences.

Cast
 Marlon Brando as Valentine "Snakeskin" Xavier
 Joanne Woodward as Carol Cutrere
 Anna Magnani as Lady Torrance
 Maureen Stapleton as Vee Talbot
 Victor Jory as Jabe Torrance
 R. G. Armstrong as Sheriff Jordan Talbot
 John Baragrey as David Cutrere
 Virgilia Chew as Nurse Porter
 Ben Yaffee as "Dog" Hamma
 Joe Brown Jr. as "Pee Wee" Binnings
 Mary Perry
 Madame Spivy as Ruby Lightfoot
 Sally Gracie as Dolly Hamma
 Lucille Benson as Beulah Binnings
 Emory Richardson as Uncle Pleasant, the Conjure Man
 Neil Harrison
 Frank Borgman as Gas Station Attendant
 Janice Mars as Attendant's Wife
 Debbie Lynch as Lonely Girl
 Jeanne Barr
 Herb Vigran as Caliope Player

Critical reception
In his review in The New York Times, Bosley Crowther described the film as a piercing account of loneliness and disappointment in a crass and tyrannical world . . . [Sidney Lumet's] plainly perceptive understanding of the deep-running skills of the two stars, his daring with faces in close-up and his out-right audacity in pacing his film at a morbid tempo that lets time drag and passions slowly shape are responsible for much of the insistence and the mesmeric quality that emerge . . . Mr. Brando and Miss Magnani . . . being fine and intelligent performers . . . play upon deep emotional chords . . . Miss Woodward is perhaps a bit too florid for full credibility . . . But Miss Stapleton's housewife is touching and Victor Jory is simply superb as the inhuman, sadistic husband . . . An excellent musical score by Kenyon Hopkins, laced with crystalline sounds and guitar strains, enhances the mood of sadness in this sensitive film.

In the Chicago Reader, Jonathan Rosenbaum observed, "Unfortunately, director Sidney Lumet, who's often out of his element when he leaves New York, seems positively baffled by the gothic south and doesn't know quite what to do with the overlay of Greek myth either."

The Time Out London Film Guide feels that "despite its stellar credentials, just about everything is wrong with this adaptation of Tennessee Williams' play Orpheus Descending . . . Lumet's direction is either ponderous or pretentious, and he failed to crack the problem of the florid stage dialogue and a dangerously weak role for Brando", and Channel 4 describes it as "a less than satisfying experience . . . disappointing stuff."

In popular culture
Some dialogue from a scene in the film was used by Australian hip hop trio Bliss n Eso in their song "Never Land", off their album Running on Air.

Sailor Ripley (Nicolas Cage) wears a snakeskin jacket exactly like Val's in the film Wild at Heart.

See also
 List of American films of 1960

References

External links
 
 
 
 
The Fugitive Kind: When Sidney Went to Tennessee an essay by David Thomson at the Criterion Collection

1960 films
American drama films
1960 drama films
American films based on plays
Films set in New Orleans
Films shot in New Orleans
Films with screenplays by Tennessee Williams
Southern Gothic films
Films directed by Sidney Lumet
Films based on works by Tennessee Williams
Films scored by Kenyon Hopkins
1960s English-language films
1960s American films